is a 1985 Japanese film directed by Koreyoshi Kurahara.

Cast
Kin'ya Kitaōji
Yūko Kotegawa
Yoshiko Mita
Akira Nakao
Shinsuke Ashida
Eiji Okada
Mariko Kaga

Awards and nominations
10h Hochi Film Award 
 Won: Best Actor - Kin'ya Kitaōji

References

1985 films
Films directed by Koreyoshi Kurahara
1980s Japanese-language films
1980s Japanese films